The  is a mid-size station wagon produced by the Japanese automobile manufacturer Honda. It is based on the sixth-generation Accord.

Overview 

Upon its introduction in 1999, the Avancier was available with a 2.3-litre F23A VTEC four-cylinder engine producing  mated to a 4-speed automatic transmission or a 3.0-litre J30A VTEC V6 engine producing  mated to a 5-speed automatic transmission. It can be had with a front-wheel drive or the Honda's real-time four-wheel drive system. The V6-engined Avancier can be optioned with an "Intelligent Highway Cruise Control" (IHCC) that used a radar to determine and maintain a reliable distance with the car in front and capable to maintain a speed. Due to the large engine displacements, the Avancier was considered as a mid-size wagon in Japan instead of a compact wagon. The dimensions also contribute to such classification in Japan.

When the Accord underwent a full model change, the production of Avancier ceased by 2003.

Avancier (station wagon)
Cars introduced in 1999
2000s cars
Mid-size cars
Station wagons
Front-wheel-drive vehicles
All-wheel-drive vehicles